Brandon Wood (born January 5, 1989) is an American professional basketball player. He played college basketball at Southern Illinois, Valparaiso and Michigan State.

High school career
Wood played high school basketball at Kokomo High School, in Kokomo, Indiana.

College career
Wood played college basketball for Southern Illinois, Highland CC, Valparaiso and Michigan State from 2007 to 2012.

Professional career
In January 2016 he signed with Israeli team Elitzur Yavne of the Liga Leumit. In August 2016 Wood signed for Swiss team BBC Monthey.

On November 6, 2018, Wood joined Panionios of the Greek Basket League. He left the team after only one game, but after the departure of head coach Vassilis Fragkias, he briefly returned to the team's squad, only to be dismissed once again.

In August 2019, Woods signed with Mexican club Libertadores de Querétaro of the LNBP.

References

External links
Michigan State Athletic bio
Hungarian League profile
http://basketball.eurobasket.com/player/Brandon_Wood/136032
https://web.archive.org/web/20160304110440/https://www.sport195.com/news_stories/wood-is-back-at-alba-ex-gussing-16230813
http://ekipa.mk/brendon-vud-e-noviot-amerikanets-vo-mzt/

1989 births
Living people
Alba Fehérvár players
American expatriate basketball people in Austria
American expatriate basketball people in Greece
American expatriate basketball people in Hungary
American expatriate basketball people in Israel
American expatriate basketball people in Italy
American expatriate basketball people in Lithuania
American expatriate basketball people in Morocco
American expatriate basketball people in North Macedonia
American expatriate basketball people in Switzerland
American men's basketball players
AS Salé (basketball) players
Basketball players from Indiana
BBC Monthey players
BC Lietkabelis players
Elitzur Yavne B.C. players
Junior college men's basketball players in the United States
Libertadores de Querétaro players
Michigan State Spartans men's basketball players
Pallacanestro Trieste players
Panionios B.C. players
Point guards
Shooting guards
Southern Illinois Salukis men's basketball players
Sportspeople from Kokomo, Indiana
Valparaiso Beacons men's basketball players
Windy City Bulls players